Gliniczek  is a village in the administrative district of Gmina Tarnowiec, within Jasło County, Subcarpathian Voivodeship, in south-eastern Poland.

The village has a population of 398.

References

Gliniczek